Never Steal Anything Small is a 1959 American CinemaScope comedy-drama musical film directed by Charles Lederer and starring James Cagney and Shirley Jones. It is based on the play The Devil's Hornpipe by Maxwell Anderson and Rouben Mamoulian.

Plot
Jake Macllaney will do just about anything to win the presidential election of longshoreman union Local 26. When he encounters young upright attorney Dan Cabot and Cabot's attractive wife Linda, Macllaney breaks up their marriage, pursues Linda, and pins a grand larceny rap on Dan.

Cast
 James Cagney as Jake Macllaney 
 Shirley Jones as Linda Cabot
 Roger Smith as Dan Cabot
 Cara Williams as Winnipeg Simmons
 Nehemiah Persoff as Pinelli
 Royal Dano as Words Cannon
 Anthony Caruso as Lt. Tevis
 Horace McMahon as O.K. Merritt
 Virginia Vincent as Ginger 
 Jack Albertson as Sleep-Out Charlie Barnes
 Robert J. Wilke as Lennie
 Herbie Faye as Hymie 
 Billy M. Greene as Ed Barton
 Barry Russo as Ward (as John Duke)
 Jack Orrison as Osborne
 Roland Winters as Doctor
 Ingrid Goude as Model 
 Sanford Seegar as Fats Ranney
 Edward McNally as Thomas (as Ed "Skipper" McNally)
 Gregg Barton as Deputy Warden
 Bruce Glover as Stevedore (uncredited)

Production
Filmed in color, this musical was directed by Charles Lederer. It is about racketeers infiltrating the labor movement. Cagney plays a dishonest but charming union boss. This was Cagney's final musical film. Jones, who plays a happily married woman whom the labor leader wants to steal away, performs a lively musical number, spoofing television commercials. The film features a duet by Cagney and Williams on "I'm Sorry, I Want a Ferrari."

See also
 List of American films of 1959

References

External links

1959 musical comedy films
1959 films
American films based on plays
American musical comedy films
Universal Pictures films
Films with screenplays by Charles Lederer
Films directed by Charles Lederer
1950s English-language films
1950s American films